The Sino-Soviet split was the breaking of political relations between the People's Republic of China and the Soviet Union caused by doctrinal divergences that arose from their different interpretations and practical applications of Marxism–Leninism, as influenced by their respective geopolitics during the Cold War of 1947–1991. In the late 1950s and early 1960s, Sino-Soviet debates about the interpretation of orthodox Marxism became specific disputes about the Soviet Union's policies of national de-Stalinization and international peaceful coexistence with the Western Bloc, which Chinese founding father Mao Zedong decried as revisionism. Against that ideological background, China took a belligerent stance towards the Western world, and publicly rejected the Soviet Union's policy of peaceful coexistence between the Western Bloc and Eastern Bloc. In addition, Beijing resented the Soviet Union's growing ties with India due to factors such as the Sino-Indian border dispute, and Moscow feared that Mao was too nonchalant about the horrors of nuclear warfare.

In 1956, CPSU first secretary Nikita Khrushchev denounced Stalin and Stalinism in the speech On the Cult of Personality and its Consequences and began the de-Stalinization of the USSR. Mao and the Chinese leadership were appalled as the PRC and the USSR progressively diverged in their interpretations and applications of Leninist theory. By 1961, their intractable ideological differences provoked the PRC's formal denunciation of Soviet communism as the work of "revisionist traitors" in the USSR. The PRC also declared the Soviet Union social imperialist. For Eastern Bloc countries, the Sino-Soviet split was a question of who would lead the revolution for world communism, and to whom (China or the USSR) the vanguard parties of the world would turn for political advice, financial aid, and military assistance. In that vein, both countries competed for the leadership of world communism through the vanguard parties native to the countries in their spheres of influence.

In the Western world, the Sino-Soviet split transformed the bi-polar cold war into a tri-polar one. The rivalry facilitated Mao's realization of Sino-American rapprochement with the US President Richard Nixon's visit to China in 1972. In the West, the policies of triangular diplomacy and linkage emerged. Like the Tito–Stalin split, the occurrence of the Sino-Soviet split also weakened the concept of monolithic communism, the Western perception that the communist nations were collectively united and would not have significant ideological clashes. However, the USSR and China continued to cooperate in North Vietnam during the Vietnam War into the 1970s, despite rivalry elsewhere. Historically, the Sino-Soviet split facilitated the Marxist–Leninist Realpolitik with which Mao established the tri-polar geopolitics (PRC–USA–USSR) of the late-period Cold War (1956–1991) to create an anti-Soviet front, which Maoists connected to Three Worlds Theory. According to Lüthi, there is "no documentary evidence that the Chinese or the Soviets thought about their relationship within a triangular framework during the period."

Origins

Reluctant co-belligerents 

During the Second Sino-Japanese War, the Chinese Communist Party (CCP) and the nationalist Kuomintang party (KMT) set aside their civil war to expel the Empire of Japan from the Republic of China. To that end, the Soviet leader, Joseph Stalin, ordered Mao Zedong, leader of the CCP, to co-operate with Generalissimo Chiang Kai-shek, leader of the KMT, in fighting the Japanese. Following the surrender of Japan at the end of World War II, both parties resumed their civil war, which the communists won by 1949.

At the war's conclusion, Stalin advised Mao not to seize political power at that time, and, instead, to collaborate with Chiang due to the 1945 USSR–KMT Treaty of Friendship and Alliance. Mao abided Stalin in communist solidarity. Yet, three months after the Japanese surrender, in November 1945, when Chiang opposed the annexation of Tannu Uriankhai (Mongolia) to the USSR, Stalin broke the treaty requiring the Red Army's withdrawal from Manchuria (giving Mao regional control) and ordered General Rodion Malinovsky to give the Chinese communists the Japanese leftover weapons.

In the five-year post-World War II period, the United States partly financed Chiang, his nationalist political party, and the National Revolutionary Army. However, Washington put heavy pressure on Chiang to form a joint government with the communists. US envoy George Marshall spent 13 months in China trying without success to broker peace. In the concluding three-year period of the Chinese Civil War, the CCP defeated and expelled the KMT from mainland China. Consequently, the KMT retreated to Taiwan in December 1949.

Chinese communist revolution 

As a revolutionary theoretician of communism seeking to realize a socialist state in China, Mao developed and adapted the urban ideology of Orthodox Marxism for practical application to the agrarian conditions of pre-industrial China and the Chinese people. Mao's Sinification of Marxism-Leninism, Mao Zedong Thought, established political pragmatism as the first priority for realizing the accelerated modernization of a country and a people, and ideological orthodoxy as the secondary priority because Orthodox Marxism originated for practical application to the socio-economic conditions of industrialized Western Europe in the 19th century.

During the Chinese Civil War in 1947, Mao dispatched US journalist Anna Louise Strong to the West, bearing political documents explaining China's socialist future, and asked that she "show them to Party leaders in the United States and Europe", for their better understanding of the Chinese Communist Revolution, but that it was not "necessary to take them to Moscow."

Mao trusted Strong because of her positive reportage about him, as a theoretician of communism, in the article "The Thought of Mao Tse-Tung", and about the CCP's communist revolution, in the 1948 book Dawn Comes Up Like Thunder Out of China: An Intimate Account of the Liberated Areas in China, which reports that Mao's intellectual achievement was "to change Marxism from a European [form] to an Asiatic form . . . in ways of which neither Marx nor Lenin could dream."

Treaty of Sino-Soviet friendship 

In 1950, Mao and Stalin safeguarded the national interests of China and the Soviet Union with the Treaty of Friendship, Alliance and Mutual Assistance. The treaty improved the two countries' geopolitical relationship on political, military and economic levels. Stalin's largesse to Mao included a loan for $300 million; military aid, should Japan attack the PRC; and the transfer of the Chinese Eastern Railway in Manchuria, Port Arthur and Dalian to Chinese control. In return, the PRC recognized the independence of the Mongolian People's Republic.

Despite the favourable terms, the treaty of socialist friendship included the PRC in the geopolitical hegemony of the USSR, but unlike the governments of the Soviet satellite states in Eastern Europe, the USSR did not control Mao's government. In six years, the great differences between the Soviet and the Chinese interpretations and applications of Marxism–Leninism voided the Sino-Soviet Treaty of Friendship.

In 1953, guided by Soviet economists, the PRC applied the USSR's model of planned economy, which gave first priority to the development of heavy industry, and second priority to the production of consumer goods. Later, ignoring the guidance of technical advisors, Mao launched the Great Leap Forward to transform agrarian China into an industrialized country with disastrous results for people and land. Mao's unrealistic goals for agricultural production went unfulfilled because of poor planning and realization, which aggravated rural starvation and increased the number of deaths caused by the Great Chinese Famine, which resulted from three years of drought and poor weather.

Socialist relations repaired
In 1954, Soviet first secretary Nikita Khrushchev repaired relations between the USSR and the PRC with trade agreements, a formal acknowledgement of Stalin's economic unfairness to the PRC, fifteen industrial-development projects, and exchanges of technicians (c. 10,000) and political advisors (c. 1,500), whilst Chinese labourers were sent to fill shortages of manual workers in Siberia. Despite this, Mao and Khrushchev disliked each other, both personally and ideologically. However, by 1955, consequent to Khrushchev's having repaired Soviet relations with Mao and the Chinese, 60% of the PRC's exports went to the USSR, by way of the five-year plans of China begun in 1953.

Discontents of de-Stalinization 

In early 1956, Sino-Soviet relations began deteriorating, following Khrushchev's de-Stalinization of the USSR, which he initiated with the speech On the Cult of Personality and its Consequences that criticized Stalin and Stalinism – especially the Great Purge of Soviet society, of the rank-and-file of the Soviet Armed Forces, and of the Communist Party of the Soviet Union (CPSU). In light of de-Stalinization, the CPSU's changed ideological orientation – from Stalin's confrontation of the West to Khrushchev's peaceful coexistence with it– posed problems of ideological credibility and political authority for Mao, who had emulated Stalin's style of leadership and practical application of Marxism–Leninism in the development of socialism with Chinese characteristics and the PRC as a country.

The Hungarian Revolution of 1956 against the rule of Moscow was a severe political concern for Mao, because it had required military intervention to suppress, and its occurrence weakened the political legitimacy of the Communist Party to be in government. In response to that discontent among the European members of the Eastern Bloc, the Chinese Communist Party denounced the USSR's de-Stalinization as revisionism, and reaffirmed the Stalinist ideology, policies, and practices of Mao's government as the correct course for achieving socialism in China. This event, indicating Sino-Soviet divergences of Marxist–Leninist practice and interpretation, began fracturing "monolithic communism" — the Western perception of absolute ideological unity in the Eastern Bloc.

From Mao's perspective, the success of the Soviet foreign policy of peaceful coexistence with the West would geopolitically isolate the PRC; whilst the Hungarian Revolution indicated the possibility of revolt in the PRC, and in China's sphere of influence. To thwart such discontent, Mao launched in 1956 the Hundred Flowers Campaign of political liberalization – the freedom of speech to criticize government, the bureaucracy, and the CCP publicly. However, the campaign proved too successful when blunt criticism of Mao was voiced. Consequent to the relative freedoms of the de-Stalinized USSR, Mao retained the Stalinist model of Marxist–Leninist economy, government, and society.

Ideological differences between Mao and Khrushchev compounded the insecurity of the new communist leader in China. Following the Chinese civil war, Mao was especially sensitive to ideological shifts that might undermine the CCP, the Chinese Communist Party. In an era saturated by this form of ideological instability, Khrushchev’s anti-Stalinism was particularly impactful to Mao. Mao saw himself as a descendent in a long Marxist-Leninist lineage of which Stalin was the most recent figurehead. Chinese leaders began to associate Stalin’s successor with anti-party elements within China. Khrushchev was pinned as a revisionist. Popular sentiment within China regarded Khrushchev as a representative of the upper-class, and Chinese Marxist-Leninists viewed the leader as a blight on the communist project. While the two nations had significant ideological similarities, domestic instability drove a wedge between the nations as they began to adopt different visions of communism following the death of Stalin in 1953. 

Popular sentiment within China changed as Khrushchev’s policies changed. Stalin had accepted that the USSR would carry much of the economic burden of the Korean War, but, when Khrushchev came to power, he created a repayment plan under which the PRC would reimburse the Soviet Union within an eight year period. However, China was experiencing significant food shortages at this time, and, when grain shipments were routed to the Soviet Union instead of feeding the Chinese public, faith in the Soviets plummeted. These policy changes were interpreted as Khrushchev’s abandonment of the communist project and the nations’ shared identity as Marxist-Leninists. As a result, Khrushchev became Mao’s scapegoat during China’s food crisis.

Conflicting national interests 

In July 1958, in Beijing, Khrushchev and Mao were negotiating joint Sino-Soviet naval bases in China, from which nuclear-armed Soviet Navy ballistic missile submarines would deter US intervention in East Asia. The agreement failed when Mao accused Khrushchev of trying to establish Soviet control of the PRC's coast. At the end of August, Mao sought the PRC's sovereignty upon Taiwan by attacking the Matsu islands and Kinmen island which resulted in the Second Taiwan Strait Crisis.

In launching that regional war, Mao did not inform Khrushchev. Formal, ideological response to that geopolitical contingency compelled Khrushchev to revise the USSR's policy of peaceful coexistence to include regional wars, such as the recent Taiwan crisis. Mao's withholding of information from Khrushchev worsened their personal–political relations, especially because the US threatened nuclear war upon China and the USSR, if the PRC invaded Taiwan; thus Mao's continual shoot-outs with Chiang Kai-shek caused Khrushchev to react to Sino-American quarrels about the remnants of the civil war in China.

Khrushchev doubted Mao's mental sanity, because his unrealistic policies of geopolitical confrontation might provoke nuclear war between the capitalist and the communist blocs. To thwart Mao's warmongering, Khrushchev cancelled foreign-aid agreements and the delivery of Soviet atomic bombs to the PRC.

Two Chinas 
Throughout the 1950s, Khrushchev maintained positive Sino-Soviet relations with foreign aid, especially nuclear technology for the Chinese atomic bomb project, Project 596. However, political tensions persisted because the economic benefits of the USSR's peaceful-coexistence policy voided the belligerent PRC's geopolitical credibility among the nations under Chinese hegemony, especially after a failed PRC–US rapprochement. In the Chinese sphere of influence, that Sino-American diplomatic failure and the presence of US nuclear weapons in Taiwan justified Mao's confrontational foreign policies with Taiwan.

In late 1958, the CCP revived Mao's guerrilla-period cult of personality to portray Chairman Mao as the charismatic, visionary leader solely qualified to control the policy, administration, and popular mobilization required to realize the Great Leap Forward to industrialize China. Moreover, to the Eastern Bloc, Mao portrayed the PRC's warfare with Taiwan and the accelerated modernization of the Great Leap Forward as Stalinist examples of Marxism–Leninism adapted to Chinese conditions. These circumstances allowed ideological Sino-Soviet competition, and Mao publicly criticized Khrushchev's economic and foreign policies as deviations from Marxism–Leninism.

Onset of the disputes

To Mao, the events of the 1958–1959 period indicated that Khrushchev was politically untrustworthy as an orthodox Marxist. In 1959, First Secretary Khrushchev met with US President Dwight Eisenhower to decrease US-Soviet geopolitical tensions. To that end, the USSR: (i) reneged an agreement for technical aid to develop Project 596, and (ii) sided with India in the Sino-Indian War. Each US-Soviet collaboration offended Mao and he perceived Khrushchev as an opportunist who had become too tolerant of the West. The CCP said that the CPSU concentrated too much on "Soviet–US co-operation for the domination of the world", with geopolitical actions that contradicted Marxism–Leninism.

The final face-to-face meeting between Mao and Khruschev took place in October 2, 1959, when Khrushchev visited Beijing to mark the 10th anniversary of the Chinese Revolution. By this point relations had deteriorated to the level where the Chinese were going out of their way to humiliate the Soviet leader - for example, there was no honour guard to greet him, no Chinese leader gave a speech, and when Khrushchev insisted on giving a speech of his own, no microphone was provided. The speech in question would turn out to contain praise of the US President Eisenhower, whom Khrushchev had recently met, obviously an intentional insult to Communist China. The leaders of the two Socialist states would not meet again for the next 30 years.

Khrushchev's criticism of Albania at the 22nd CPSU Congress

In June 1960, at the zenith of de-Stalinization, the USSR denounced the People's Republic of Albania as a politically backward country for retaining Stalinism as government and model of socialism. In turn, Bao Sansan said that the CCP's message to the cadres in China was:

"When Khrushchev stopped Russian aid to Albania, Hoxha said to his people: 'Even if we have to eat the roots of grass to live, we won't take anything from Russia.' China is not guilty of chauvinism, and immediately sent food to our brother country."

During his opening speech at the CPSU's 22nd Party Congress on 17 October 1961 in Moscow, Khrushchev once again criticized Albania as a politically backward state and the Albanian Party of Labour as well as its leadership, including Enver Hoxha, for refusing to support reforms against Stalin's legacy, in addition to their criticism of rapprochement with Yugoslavia, leading to the Soviet–Albanian split. In response to this rebuke, on the 19th of October the delegation representing China at the Party Congress led by Chinese Premier Zhou Enlai sharply criticised Moscow's stance towards Tirana:

“We hold that should a dispute or difference unfortunately arise between fraternal parties or fraternal countries, it should be resolved patiently in the spirit of proletarian internationalism and according to the principles of equality and of unanimity through consultation. Public, one-sided censure of any fraternal party does not help unity and is not helpful in resolving problems. To bring a dispute between fraternal parties or fraternal countries into the open in the face of the enemy cannot be regarded as a serious Marxist- Leninist attitude."

Subsequently, on the 21st of October, Zhou visited the Lenin Mausoleum (then still entombing Stalin's body), laying two wreathes at the base of the site, one of which read "Dedicated to the great Marxist, Comrade Stalin";  on the 23rd of October, the Chinese delegation left Moscow for Beijing early, before the Congress' conclusion; within days, Khrushchev had Stalin's body removed from the mausoleum.

Mao, Khrushchev, and the US
In 1960, Mao expected Khrushchev to deal aggressively with Dwight D. Eisenhower by holding him to account for the USSR having shot down a U-2 spy plane, the CIA's photographing of military bases in the USSR; aerial espionage that the US said had been discontinued. In Paris, at the Four Powers Summit meeting, Khrushchev demanded and failed to receive Eisenhower's apology for the CIA's continued aerial espionage of the USSR. In China, Mao and the CCP interpreted Eisenhower's refusal to apologize as disrespectful of the national sovereignty of socialist countries, and held political rallies aggressively demanding Khrushchev's military confrontation with US aggressors; without such decisive action, Khrushchev lost face with the PRC.

In the Romanian capital of Bucharest, at the International Meeting of Communist and Workers Parties (November 1960), Mao and Khrushchev respectively attacked the Soviet and the Chinese interpretations of Marxism-Leninism as the wrong road to world socialism in the USSR and in China. Mao said that Khrushchev's emphases on consumer goods and material plenty would make the Soviets ideologically soft and un-revolutionary, to which Khrushchev replied: "If we could promise the people nothing, except revolution, they would scratch their heads and say: 'Isn't it better to have good goulash?

Personal attacks
In the 1960s, public displays of acrimonious quarrels about Marxist-Leninist doctrine characterized relations between hardline Stalinist Chinese and post-Stalinist Soviet Communists. At the Romanian Communist Party Congress, the CCP's senior officer Peng Zhen quarrelled with Khrushchev, after the latter had insulted Mao as being a Chinese nationalist, a geopolitical adventurist, and an ideological deviationist from Marxism-Leninism. In turn, Peng insulted Khrushchev as a revisionist whose régime showed him to be a "patriarchal, arbitrary, and tyrannical" ruler. In the event, Khrushchev denounced the PRC with 80 pages of criticism to the congress of the PRC.

In response to the insults, Khrushchev withdrew 1,400 Soviet technicians from the PRC, which cancelled some 200 joint scientific projects. In response, Mao justified his belief that Khrushchev had somehow caused China's great economic failures and the famines that occurred in the period of the Great Leap Forward. Nonetheless, the PRC and the USSR remained pragmatic allies, which allowed Mao to alleviate famine in China and to resolve Sino-Indian border disputes. To Mao, Khrushchev had lost political authority and ideological credibility, because his US-Soviet détente had resulted in successful military (aerial) espionage against the USSR and public confrontation with an unapologetic capitalist enemy. Khrushchev's miscalculation of person and circumstance voided US-Soviet diplomacy at the Four Powers Summit in Paris.

Monolithic communism fractured 

In late 1961, at the 22nd Congress of the CPSU, the PRC and the USSR revisited their doctrinal disputes about the orthodox interpretation and application of Marxism–Leninism. In December 1961, the USSR broke diplomatic relations with Albania, which escalated the Sino-Soviet disputes from the political-party level to the national-government level.

In late 1962, the PRC broke relations with the USSR because Khrushchev did not go to war with the US over the Cuban Missile Crisis. Regarding that Soviet loss-of-face, Mao said that "Khrushchev has moved from adventurism to capitulationism" with a negotiated, bilateral, military stand-down. Khrushchev replied that Mao's belligerent foreign policies would lead to an East–West nuclear war. For the Western powers, the averted atomic war threatened by the Cuban Missile Crisis made nuclear disarmament their political priority. To that end, the US, the UK, and the USSR agreed to the Partial Nuclear Test Ban Treaty in 1963, which formally forbade nuclear-detonation tests in the Earth's atmosphere, in outer space, and under water – yet did allow the underground testing and detonation of atomic bombs. In that time, the PRC's nuclear-weapons program, Project 596, was nascent, and Mao perceived the test-ban treaty as the nuclear powers' attempt to thwart the PRC's becoming a nuclear superpower.

Between 6–20 July 1963, a series of Soviet-Chinese negotiations were held in Moscow. However, both sides maintained their own ideological views and, therefore, negotiations failed. In March 1964, the Romanian Workers' Party publicly announced the intention of the Bucharest authorities to mediate the Sino-Soviet conflict. In reality, however, the Romanian mediation approach represented only a pretext for forging a Sino-Romanian rapprochement, without arousing the Soviets' suspicions.

Romania was neutral in the Sino-Soviet split. Its neutrality in the Sino-Soviet dispute along with being the small communist country with the most influence in global affairs enabled Romania to be recognized by the world as the "third force" of the communist world. Romania's independence - achieved in the early 1960s through its freeing from its Soviet satellite status - was tolerated by Moscow because Romania was not bordering the Iron Curtain - being surrounded by socialist states - and because its ruling party was not going to abandon communism. North Korea under Kim Il-sung also remained neutral because of its strategic status after the Korean War, although it later moved more decisively towards the USSR after Deng Xiaoping's Chinese economic reform.

The Italian Communist Party (PCI), one of the largest and most politically influential communist parties in Western Europe, adopted an ambivalent stance towards Mao's split from the USSR. Although the PCI chastised Mao for breaking the previous global unity of socialist states and criticised the Cultural Revolution brought about by him, it simultaneously applauded and heaped praise on him for the People's Republic of China's enormous assistance to North Vietnam in its war against South Vietnam and the United States.

As a Marxist–Leninist, Mao was much angered that Khrushchev did not go to war with the US over their failed Bay of Pigs Invasion and the United States embargo against Cuba of continual economic and agricultural sabotage. For the Eastern Bloc, Mao addressed those Sino-Soviet matters in "Nine Letters" critical of Khrushchev and his leadership of the USSR. Moreover, the break with the USSR allowed Mao to reorient the development of the PRC with formal relations (diplomatic, economic, political) with the countries of Asia, Africa, and Latin America.

Formal and informal statements 

In the 1960s, the Sino-Soviet split allowed only written communications between the PRC and the USSR, in which each country supported their geopolitical actions with formal statements of Marxist–Leninist ideology as the true road to world communism, which is the general line of the party. In June 1963, the PRC published The Chinese Communist Party's Proposal Concerning the General Line of the International Communist Movement, to which the USSR replied with the Open Letter of the Communist Party of the Soviet Union; each ideological stance perpetuated the Sino-Soviet split. In 1964, Mao said that, in light of the Chinese and Soviet differences about the interpretation and practical application of Orthodox Marxism, a counter-revolution had occurred and re-established capitalism in the USSR; consequently, following Soviet suit, the Warsaw Pact countries broke relations with the PRC.

In late 1964, after Nikita Khrushchev had been deposed, Chinese Premier Zhou Enlai met with the new Soviet leaders, First Secretary Leonid Brezhnev and Premier Alexei Kosygin, but their ideological differences proved a diplomatic impasse to renewed economic relations. The Soviet defense minister's statement damaged the prospects of improved Sino-Soviet relations. Historian Daniel Leese noted that improvement of the relations "that had seemed possible after Khrushchev's fall evaporated after the Soviet minister of defense, Rodion Malinovsky... approached Chinese Marshal He Long, member of the Chinese delegation to Moscow, and asked when China would finally get rid of Mao like the CPSU had disposed of Khrushchev." Back in China, Zhou reported to Mao that Brezhnev's Soviet government retained the policy of peaceful coexistence which Mao had denounced as "Khrushchevism without Khrushchev"; despite the change of leadership, the Sino-Soviet split remained open. At the Glassboro Summit Conference, between Kosygin and US President Lyndon B. Johnson, the PRC accused the USSR of betraying the peoples of the Eastern bloc countries. The official interpretation, by Radio Peking, reported that US and Soviet politicians discussed "a great conspiracy, on a worldwide basis ... criminally selling the rights of the revolution of [the] Vietnam people, [of the] Arabs, as well as [those of] Asian, African, and Latin-American peoples, to US imperialists".

Conflict

Cultural Revolution 

To regain political supremacy in the PRC, Mao launched the Great Proletarian Cultural Revolution in 1966 to counter the Soviet-style bureaucracies (personal-power-centres) that had become established in education, agriculture, and industrial management. Abiding Mao's proclamations for universal ideological orthodoxy, schools and universities closed throughout China when students organized themselves into politically radical Red Guards. Lacking a leader, a political purpose, and a social function, the ideologically discrete units of Red Guards soon degenerated into political factions, each of whom claimed to be more Maoist than the other factions.

In establishing the ideological orthodoxy presented in the Little Red Book (Quotations from Chairman Mao Tse-tung), the political violence of the Red Guards provoked civil war in parts of China, which Mao suppressed with the People's Liberation Army (PLA), who imprisoned the fractious Red Guards. Moreover, when Red Guard factionalism occurred within the PLA – Mao's base of political power – he dissolved the Red Guards, and then reconstituted the CCP with the new generation of Maoists who had endured and survived the Cultural Revolution that purged the "anti-communist" old generation from the party and from China.

As social engineering, the Cultural Revolution reasserted the political primacy of Maoism, but also stressed, strained, and broke the PRC's relations with the USSR and the West. Geopolitically, despite their querulous "Maoism vs. Marxism–Leninism" disputes about interpretations and practical applications of Marxism-Leninism, the USSR and the PRC advised, aided, and supplied North Vietnam during the Vietnam War, which Mao had defined as a peasant revolution against foreign imperialism. In socialist solidarity, the PRC allowed safe passage for the Soviet Union's matériel to North Vietnam to prosecute the war against the US-sponsored Republic of Vietnam, until 1968, after the Chinese withdrawal.

Border conflict 

In the late 1960s, the continual quarrelling between the CCP and the CPSU about the correct interpretations and applications of Marxism–Leninism escalated to small-scale warfare at the Sino-Soviet border.

In 1966, for diplomatic resolution, the Chinese revisited the national matter of the Sino-Soviet border demarcated in the 19th century, but originally imposed upon the Qing Dynasty by way of unequal treaties that annexed Chinese territory to the Russian Empire. Despite not asking the return of territory, the PRC asked the USSR to acknowledge formally and publicly that such an historic injustice against China (the 19th-century border) was dishonestly realized with the 1858 Treaty of Aigun and the 1860 Convention of Peking. The Soviet government ignored the matter.

In 1968, the Soviet Army had massed along the  border with the PRC, especially at the Xinjiang frontier, in north-west China, where the Soviets might readily induce the Turkic peoples into a separatist insurrection. In 1961, the USSR had stationed 12 divisions of soldiers and 200 aeroplanes at that border. By 1968, the Soviet Armed Forces had stationed six divisions of soldiers in Outer Mongolia and 16 divisions, 1,200 aeroplanes, and 120 medium-range missiles at the Sino-Soviet border to confront 47 light divisions of the Chinese Army. By March 1969, the border confrontations escalated, including fighting at the Ussuri River, the Zhenbao Island incident, and Tielieketi.

After the border conflict, "spy wars" involving numerous espionage agents occurred on Soviet and Chinese territory through the 1970s. In 1972, the Soviet Union also renamed placenames in the Russian Far East to the Russian language and Russified toponyms, replacing the native and/or Chinese names.

Nuclear China 
In the early 1960s, the United States feared that a "nuclear China" would imbalance the bi-polar Cold War between the US and the USSR. To keep the PRC from achieving the geopolitical status of a nuclear power, the US administrations of both John F. Kennedy and Lyndon B. Johnson considered ways either to sabotage or to attack directly the Chinese nuclear program — aided either by Nationalist China or by the USSR. To avert nuclear war, Khrushchev refused the US offer to participate in a US-Soviet pre-emptive attack against the PRC.

To prevent the Chinese from building a nuclear bomb, the United States Armed Forces recommended indirect measures, such as diplomacy and propaganda, and direct measures, such as infiltration and sabotage, an invasion by the Chinese Nationalists in Taiwan, maritime blockades, a South Korean invasion of North Korea, conventional air attacks against the nuclear production facilities, and dropping a nuclear bomb against a "selected CHICOM [Chinese Communist] target". On 16 October 1964, the PRC detonated their first nuclear bomb, a uranium-235 implosion-fission device, with an explosive yield of 22 kilotons of TNT; and publicly acknowledged the USSR's technical assistance in realizing Project 596.

Aware of the Soviet nuclear threat, the PRC built large-scale underground bomb shelters, such as the Underground City in Beijing, and the military bomb shelters of Underground Project 131, a command center in Hubei, and the 816 Nuclear Military Plant, in the Fuling District of Chongqing.

Geopolitical pragmatism 

In October 1969, after the seven-month Sino-Soviet border conflict, in Beijing, Premier Alexei Kosygin secretly spoke with Premier Zhou Enlai to determine jointly the demarcation of the Sino-Soviet border. Despite the border demarcation remaining indeterminate, the premiers' meetings restored Sino-Soviet diplomatic communications, which by 1970 allowed Mao to understand that the PRC could not simultaneously fight the US and the USSR while suppressing internal disorders throughout China. In July 1971, the US advisor for national security, Henry Kissinger, went to Beijing to arrange for President Richard Nixon's visit to China. Kissinger's Sino-American rapprochement offended the USSR, and Brezhnev then convoked a summit-meeting with Nixon, which re-cast the bi-polar geopolitics of the US-Soviet cold war into the tri-polar geopolitics of the PRC-US-USSR cold war. As relations between the People's Republic of China and the United States improved, so too did relations between the Soviet Union and the by now largely unrecognised Republic of China in Taiwan, although this thaw in diplomatic relations stopped well short of any Soviet official recognition of Taiwan.

To that effect, in the 1972–1973 period, the USSR deleted the Chinese and Manchu place-names – Iman (伊曼, Yiman), Tetyukhe (野猪河, yĕzhūhé), and Suchan – from the map of the Russian Far East, and replaced them with the Russian place-names: Dalnerechensk, Dalnegorsk, and Partizansk, respectively. To facilitate social acceptance of such cultural revisionism, the Soviet press misrepresented the historical presence of Chinese people – in lands gained by the Russian Empire – which provoked Russian violence against the local Chinese populations; moreover, politically inconvenient exhibits were removed from museums, and vandals covered with cement the Jurchen-script stele, about the Jin dynasty, in Khabarovsk, some 30 kilometres from the Sino-Soviet border, at the confluence of the Amur and Ussuri rivers.

Rivalry in the Third World 
In the 1970s, the ideological rivalry between the PRC and the USSR extended into the countries of Africa, Asia and of the Middle East, where each socialist country funded the vanguardism of the local Marxist–Leninist parties and militias. Their political advice, financial aid, and military assistance facilitated the realization of wars of national liberation, such as the Ogaden War between Ethiopia and Somalia; the Rhodesian Bush War between white European colonists and anti-colonial black natives; the aftermath of the Bush War, the Zimbabwean Gukurahundi massacres; the Angolan Civil War between competing national-liberation groups of guerrillas, which proved to be a US–Soviet proxy war; the Mozambican Civil War; and the guerrilla factions fighting for the liberation of Palestine. In Thailand, the pro-Chinese front organizations were based upon the local Chinese minority population, and thus proved politically ineffective as a Maoist revolutionary vanguard. In the Soviet–Afghan War, China covertly supported the opposing guerillas; even before the Soviet deployment, Moscow had accused Peking of using a newly built highway from Xinjiang to Hunza in Pakistan to arm Afghan rebels, which China denied. The KGB and Afghan KHAD cracked down on many prominent pro-China and anti-Soviet activists and guerillas in 1980.

Occasional cooperation 
At times, the 'competition' led to the USSR and PRC supporting the same factions in concert, such as when both supported North Vietnam. Both Soviet and Chinese support was vital for the supply of logistics and equipment to the NLF and PAVN. Most of the supplies were Soviet, sent through China overland. Some analyses find that Chinese economic aid was larger than that of the Soviets as early as 1965–1968. One estimate finds that 1971–1973, the PRC sent the largest amount of aid constituting 90 billion renminbi. Soviet supplies flowed freely through China from before 1965 until 1969, when they were cut off. In 1971 however, China encouraged Vietnam to seek more supplies from the Soviet Union. From 1972, Zhou Enlai encouraged expeditions of Soviet rail trips, missile shipments, allowed 400 Soviet experts to pass to Vietnam, and on 18 June 1971, reopened Soviet freight in Chinese ports. China then agreed to all Vietnamese requests of allowing Soviet warehouses to store materiel for shipment to Vietnam. The result was a solid, and relatively continuous Communist Bloc support for North Vietnam during the Sino-Soviet split. However, some of the surmounting Soviet and Chinese tensions would grow into the Sino-Vietnamese War in 1979.

After Mao

Transition from idealism to pragmatism (1976–1978) 

In 1971, the politically radical phase of the Cultural Revolution concluded with the failure of Project 571 (the coup d'état to depose Mao) and the death of the conspirator Marshal Lin Biao (Mao's executive officer), who had colluded with the Gang of Four—Jiang Qing (Mao's last wife), Zhang Chunqiao, Yao Wenyuan, and Wang Hongwen—to assume command of the PRC. As reactionary political radicals, the Gang of Four argued for regression to Stalinist ideological orthodoxy at the expense of internal economic development, but soon were suppressed by the PRC's secret intelligence service.

The re-establishment of Chinese domestic tranquility ended armed confrontation with the USSR but it did not improve diplomatic relations, because in 1973, the Soviet Army garrisons at the Sino-Soviet border were twice as large as in 1969. The continued military threat from the USSR prompted the PRC to denounce "Soviet social imperialism", by accusing the USSR of being an enemy of world revolution. Mao's statement that "the Soviet Union today is under the dictatorship of the bourgeoisie, a dictatorship of the big bourgeoisie, a dictatorship of the German fascist type, a dictatorship of the Hitler type." was also repeated by China's state press many times in the 1970s, reiterating the diplomatic position. Sino-Soviet relations would slowly and gradually improve during the 1980s.

A year after Mao's death, at the 11th National Congress of the Chinese Communist Party in 1977, the politically rehabilitated Deng Xiaoping was appointed to manage internal modernization programs. Avoiding attacks upon Mao, Deng's political moderation began the realization of Chinese economic reform by way of systematic reversals of Mao's inefficient policies, and the transition from a planned economy to a socialist market economy.

1978–1989 
In 1978, the United States and the PRC began to establish diplomatic relations. US-China military cooperation began in 1979 and in 1981 it was revealed that a joint US-China listening post had been operated in Xinjiang to monitor Soviet missile testing bases.

The Soviet Union provided intelligence and equipment support for Vietnam during the 1979 Sino-Vietnamese War. Soviet troops were deployed at the Sino-Soviet and Mongolian-Chinese border as an act of showing support to Vietnam. However, the Soviet Union refused to take any direct action to defend their ally. In December 1979, the Soviet invasion of Afghanistan led the Chinese to suspend the talks on normalizing relations with the Soviet Union, which began in September of the same year.

In the 1980s, the PRC pursued Realpolitik policies, such as "seeking truth from facts" and the "Chinese road to socialism", which withdrew the PRC from the high-level abstractions of ideology, polemic, and the revisionism of the USSR, which diminished the political importance of the Sino-Soviet split. Sino-Soviet relations were finally normalized after Mikhail Gorbachev visited China in 1989 and shook Deng's hand.

See also 

 Anti-Chinese sentiment
 Anti-Russian sentiment
 History of the Soviet Union (1953–1964)
 History of the Soviet Union (1964–1982)
 History of the People's Republic of China
 Sino-Albanian split
 Sino-American relations
 Sino-Soviet relations
 Sino-Soviet Treaty of Friendship
 Soviet imperialism

Footnotes

Further reading 
 Athwal, Amardeep. "The United States and the Sino-Soviet Split: The Key Role of Nuclear Superiority." Journal of Slavic Military Studies 17.2 (2004): 271–297.
 Chang, Jung, and Jon Halliday. Mao: The Unknown Story. New York: Alfred A. Knopf, 2005.
 Ellison, Herbert J., ed. The Sino-Soviet Conflict: A Global Perspective (1982) online
 Floyd, David. Mao against Khrushchev: A Short History of the Sino-Soviet Conflict (1964) online
 Ford, Harold P., "Calling the Sino-Soviet Split " Calling the Sino-Soviet Split", Studies in Intelligence, Winter 1998–99.
 Friedman, Jeremy. "Soviet policy in the developing world and the Chinese challenge in the 1960s." Cold War History (2010) 10#2 pp. 247–272.
 Friedman, Jeremy. Shadow Cold War: The Sino-Soviet Competition for the Third World (UNC Press Books, 2015).
 Garver, John W. China's Quest: The History of the Foreign Relations of the People's Republic (2016) pp 113–45.
 Goh, Evelyn. Constructing the US Rapprochement with China, 1961–1974: From "Red Menace" to "Tacit Ally" (Cambridge UP, 2005)
 Heinzig, Dieter. The Soviet Union and Communist China, 1945–1950: An Arduous Road to the Alliance (M. E. Sharpe, 2004). 
 Jersild, Austin. The Sino-Soviet Alliance: An International History (2014) online
 Jian, Chen. Mao's China & the Cold War. (U of North Carolina Press, 2001). online
 Kochavi, Noam. "The Sino-Soviet Split." in A Companion to John F. Kennedy (2014) pp. 366–383.
 Li, Danhui, and Yafeng Xia. "Jockeying for Leadership: Mao and the Sino-Soviet Split, October 1961 – July 1964." Journal of Cold War Studies 16.1 (2014): 24–60.
 Lewkowicz, Nicolas. The Role of Ideology in the Origins of the Cold War (Scholar's Press, 2018).
 Li, Hua-Yu et al., eds China Learns from the Soviet Union, 1949–Present (The Harvard Cold War Studies Book Series) (2011) excerpt and text search
 Li, Mingjiang. "Ideological dilemma: Mao's China and the Sino-Soviet split, 1962–63." Cold War History 11.3 (2011): 387–419.
 Lukin, Alexander. The Bear Watches the Dragon: Russia's Perceptions of China and the Evolution of Russian-Chinese Relations Since the Eighteenth Century (2002) excerpt 
 
 
 Olsen, Mari. Soviet-Vietnam Relations and the Role of China 1949–64: Changing Alliances (Routledge, 2007)
 Ross, Robert S., ed. China, the United States, and the Soviet Union: Tripolarity and Policy Making in the Cold War (1993) online
 
 Shen, Zhihua, and Yafeng Xia. "The great leap forward, the people's commune and the Sino-Soviet split." Journal of contemporary China 20.72 (2011): 861–880.
 Wang, Dong. "The Quarrelling Brothers: New Chinese Archives and a Reappraisal of the Sino-Soviet Split, 1959–1962." Cold War International History Project Working Paper Series 2005) online.
 Westad, Odd Arne, ed. Brothers in arms: the rise and fall of the Sino-Soviet alliance, 1945–1963 (Stanford UP. 1998)
 Zagoria, Donald S. The Sino-Soviet Conflict, 1956–1961 (Princeton UP, 1962), major scholarly study.

Primary sources 
 
 [Bao] Sansan and Bette Bao Lord (1964/1966), Eighth Moon: The True Story of a Young Girl's Life in Communist China, reprint, New York: Scholastic, Ch. 9, pp. 120–124. [summary of lectures to cadres on Sino-Soviet split]. 
 Prozumenshchikov, Mikhail Yu. "The Sino-Indian Conflict, the Cuban Missile Crisis, and the Sino-Soviet Split, October 1962: New Evidence from the Russian Archives." Cold War International History Project Bulletin (1996) 8#9 pp. 1996–1997. online

External links 

 The CWIHP Document Collection on the Sino-Soviet Split 
 The Great Debate: Documents of the Sino-Soviet Split at Marxists Internet Archive

20th-century conflicts
Anti-revisionism
Split
Ideological rivalry
Maoism
Marxism–Leninism
Stalinism
Nikita Khrushchev
Political schisms
1960 in China
1960 in the Soviet Union
1960 in military history
1960 in politics
Cold War
Politics of the Soviet Union